The mayor of Trieste (Italian: sindaco di Trieste) is an elected politician who, along with the Trieste's City Council, is accountable for the strategic government of Trieste, Friuli-Venezia Giulia, Italy.

The current mayor is Roberto Dipiazza, a member of the centre-right party Forza Italia, who took office on 20 June 2016.

Overview
According to the Italian Constitution, the Mayor of Trieste is member of the City Council.

The Mayor is elected by the population of Trieste, who also elect the members of the City Council, controlling the Mayor's policy guidelines and is able to enforce his resignation by a motion of no confidence. The Mayor is entitled to appoint and release the members of his government.

Since 1993 the Mayor is elected directly by Trieste's electorate: in all mayoral elections in Italy in cities with a population higher than 15,000 the voters express a direct choice for the mayor or an indirect choice voting for the party of the candidate's coalition. If no candidate receives at least 50% of votes, the top two candidates go to a second round after two weeks. The election of the City Council is based on a direct choice for the candidate with a preference vote: the candidate with the majority of the preferences is elected. The number of the seats for each party is determined proportionally.

Republic of Italy (since 1949)

City Council election (1949-1993)
From 1949 to 1993, the Mayor of Trieste was elected by the City Council.

Direct election (since 1993)
Since 1993, under provisions of new local administration law, the Mayor of Trieste is chosen by direct election, originally every four, and since 2001 every five years.

Notes

References

Trieste
 
Politics of Friuli-Venezia Giulia